The Ditson Conductor's Award, established in 1945, is the oldest award honoring conductors for their commitment to the performance of American music.  The US$5,000 purse is endowed by the Alice M. Ditson Fund at Columbia University, increased in 1999 from US$1,000. 

The Ditson Conductor's Award was established five years after the 30 April 1940 death of Alice M. Ditson, widow of music publisher Charles Healy Ditson and daughter-in-law of Oliver Ditson, founder of the publishing house that bore his name. Her will bequested $400,000 (equivalent to $ million in ) to Columbia University was for "the encouragement and aide of musicians." From this was born fellowships, public hearings, publication of the work of talented musicians and the Ditson Conductor's Award.

Ditson Conductor's Award recipients

1945 Howard Hanson
1946 Léon Barzin
1947 Alfred Wallenstein
1948 Dean Dixon
1949 Thor Johnson
1950 Izler Solomon
1951 Robert Whitney
1952 Leopold Stokowski
1953 Walter Hendl
1954 David Broekman
1955 Robert Shaw 
1956 Victor Alessandro
1957 Howard Mitchell
1958 Leonard Bernstein
1959 Julius Rudel
1960 Richard Bales
1961 Richard Franko Goldman
1962 Guy Fraser Harrison
1963 Milton Katims
1964 Emerson Buckley
1965 Jacob Avshalomov
1966 William Strickland
1967 Igor Buketoff
1968 Alan Carter
1969 Frederick Fennell
1970 Gunther Schuller
1971 Maurice Abravanel
1972 Louis Lane
1973 Stanisław Skrowaczewski
1974 Lukas Foss
1975 Antal Doráti
1976 José Serebrier 
1977 Eugene Ormandy
1978 Gregg Smith
1979 Sergiu Comissiona
1980 James A. Dixon
1981 Michael Charry
1982 Russell Patterson
1983 Julius Hegyi
1984 Leonard Slatkin
1985 Jorge Mester
1986 Efrain Guigui
1987 Dennis Russell Davies
1988 Lawrence Leighton Smith
1989 Gerard Schwarz
1990 Mstislav Rostropovich
1991 Christopher Keene
1992 Herbert Blomstedt
1993 Michael Tilson Thomas
1994 Gerhard Samuel
1995 Gustav Meier
1996 James Bolle
1997 David Zinman
1998 JoAnn Falletta 
1999 Christoph von Dohnányi
2000 James DePreist
2001 Joel Sachs
2002 Edwin London
2003 David Alan Miller
2004 Donald Portnoy
2005 David Hoose
2006 David Robertson
2007 Gil Rose
2008 Robert Spano
2009 James Levine
2010 Osmo Vänskä
2011 Alan Gilbert
2012 George Manahan
2013 Jeffrey Milarsky
2014 Harold Rosenbaum
2015 John Mauceri
2016 Cliff Colnot
2017 Marin Alsop
2018 Oliver Knussen
2019 Bradley Lubman
2020 Steven Schick
2021 John Adams
2022 Delta David Gier

References

External links
The Alice M. Ditson Fund | Conductors Award (official winners list)

 
American music awards
Awards established in 1945
Awards and prizes of Columbia University